Anthony Howard Sneazwell (4 October 1942 —) is an Australian former high jumper who competed in the 1964 Summer Olympics and in the 1968 Summer Olympics.

Family
The son of former Collingwood footballer, William Henry John Sneazwell (1906-1967), and Veronica Sneazwell (1915-2001).

Athlete
Sneazwell won the 1963 Helms Award as the most outstanding amateur athlete in Australasia. Track & Field News ranked him as the #2 high jumper in the world that year, behind only Valeriy Brumel.

Notes

References
 Sneazwell takes out Writ, The Canberra Times, (Tuesday, 12 August 1969), p.20

1942 births
Living people
Athletes from Melbourne
Australian male high jumpers
Olympic male high jumpers
Olympic athletes of Australia
Athletes (track and field) at the 1964 Summer Olympics
Athletes (track and field) at the 1968 Summer Olympics
Commonwealth Games competitors for Australia
Athletes (track and field) at the 1962 British Empire and Commonwealth Games
Japan Championships in Athletics winners
Edmonton Oilers personnel